Călărași is a town in Moldova, founded in 1848.

Long ago, the word "călărași" meant "horsemen" (today the word is "călăreți"). The name of Călărași was inspired by a legend which tells that once, when Stephen III of Moldavia fought the Ottomans, he ordered a regiment of horsemen to stand guard. They fought the Ottomans, sacrificed themselves and, finally, won the battle.

The city is the administrative center of Călărași District; it also administers one village, Oricova.

International relations

Twin towns – Sister cities 
Călărași is twinned with:

  Călărași, Romania

References

Further reading 
 Kalarash/Calarasi (pp. 362–363) at Miriam Weiner's Routes to Roots Foundation

External links 
 

Cities and towns in Moldova
1432 establishments in Europe
Orgeyevsky Uyezd
Lăpușna County (Romania)
Ținutul Nistru
Shtetls
Călărași District